Cho Kyu-hyun (better known by his mononym Kyuhyun) is a South Korean singer. His discography consists of one studio album, four extended plays, two single albums, fourteen singles, three promotional singles, and twenty one soundtrack songs. He debuted as a member of South Korean boy band Super Junior in 2006 and subsequently became a part of its subgroup Super Junior-K.R.Y. in 2006 and Super Junior-M in 2008 as well as SM Entertainment's group SM the Ballad in 2010.

Albums

Studio albums

Single albums

Extended plays

Singles

As lead artist

As featured artist

Promotional singles

Soundtrack appearances

Other appearances

Other charted songs

Music videos

See also 
Super Junior discography
SM the Ballad#Discography
Super Junior-K.R.Y.#Discography

Notes

References 

Discographies of South Korean artists
Discography
K-pop discographies